Peach Club is the fifth studio album by American rock band Emarosa. The album was released on February 8, 2019 through Hopeless Records and was produced by Courtney Ballard. It serves as a follow-up to the band's fourth studio album, 131 (2016) and shows the band's venture towards pop, synth-pop, and pop rock elements, further departing from their early post-hardcore and alternative rock sound.

The lead single, "Givin' Up", was released on November 16, 2018. The second single, "Don't Cry", was released on January 8, 2019. Two more singles, "Cautious" and "Get Back Up", were released to promote the album. In support of the album, the band toured with other groups such as Hands Like Houses and Set It Off and embarked on a headlining 2019 tour.

It is the band's first album to feature bassist Robert Joffred and also the final album released by the band through Hopeless Records, who appear to have dropped the band following allegations that surfaced against vocalist, Bradley Walden.

Background
Following the release of Emarosa's fourth studio album, 131 (2016), the band toured with other musical groups including Silverstein, A Lot Like Birds, and Jule Vera, among others. In 2018, the band began writing and recording their fifth studio album. Prior to the album's release, the band toured as support on Hands Like Houses' U.S. tour from November 10 to December 12, 2018, alongside Devour the Day.

Release and promotion
On October 17, 2018, Emarosa announced Peach Club, the release date, and limited pre-order bundles. The lead single, "Givin' Up", was released on November 16, 2018, along with its music video.

On January 8, 2019, the band released the album's second single, "Don't Cry", alongside its animated video, which premiered on PopCrush. On January 30, the band released the third single "Cautious". On February 6, the fourth single, "Get Back Up", was released.

Touring
In support of Peach Club, the band embarked on a headlining 2019 European and Russian tour in January.

The group is set to tour as support on the North American leg of American rock band Set It Off's The Midnight World Tour from June 11 to July 18, 2019, alongside Broadside and Lizzy Farrall.

Track listing

Personnel
Credits adapted from AllMusic.

Emarosa
 Bradley Walden – lead vocals
 ER White – lead guitar
 Matthew Marcellus – rhythm guitar, backing vocals
 Robert Joffred – bass, backing vocals

Additional personnel
 Courtney Ballard – production, mixing
 Alexander Hitchens, Allen Lewis and Jared Poythress – composition
 Jason Mageau – management
 Jessica Severn – art direction, design, illustrations

Charts

References

2019 albums
Hopeless Records albums
Emarosa albums